Zhang Nan (born 1 March 1990) is a Chinese badminton player who specializes in both men's and mixed doubles. He found much success in mixed doubles with his former partner Zhao Yunlei. They won gold in 2012 Summer Olympics, 3 golds in BWF World Championships in 2011, 2014 and 2015 and a gold at the 2014 Asian Games. Having won all major events as a pair, they are considered one of the most successful mixed doubles pairs of all time.

Having found huge success in mixed doubles with Zhao, Zhang partnered Fu Haifeng with whom he won gold in 2016 Summer Olympics. After this, Fu retired and Zhang partnered Liu Cheng and became World Champion in the men's doubles at the 2017 BWF World Championships.

Career

Zhang Nan is a badminton player who has achieved success in both men's and mixed doubles. In the men's doubles he has been paired with Chai Biao, Fu Haifeng, Lu Kai, Liu Cheng and Ou Xuanyi; while in the mixed doubles he has been paired with Lu Lu, Tang Jinhua, Zhao Yunlei and Li Yinhui.

2010
He participated in the 2010 Thomas Cup in Kuala Lumpur, playing for China. He also played in 2010 Asian Games in Guangzhou.

Zhang has achieved one of the three most prestigious badminton titles, winning the All England Open that year with Zhao Yunlei, winning over Nova Widianto and Liliyana Natsir of Indonesia, 21–18, 23–25, 21–18, the first pair to win the title as qualifiers.

Zhang has a larger achievement with Zhao in the mixed doubles event rather than with Chai.  Zhang and Zhao won the Japan Open title, beating compatriots Tao Jiaming and Tian Qing in the final, 21–19, 22–20. Meanwhile, Zhang and Chai's journey in Tokyo was ended by seniors Cai Yun and Fu Haifeng in the semi-finals, losing 17–21 and 16–21.

In China Open, Zhang attended the men's and mixed doubles finals but he lost in both events. In the men's doubles, South Korea's Jung Jae-sung and Lee Yong-dae emerged as the winners as they downed Zhang and Chai in straight sets, 21–15 and 21–12. In the mixed doubles final, Tao Jiaming and Tian Qing took revenge with a 21–18, 21–17 triumph over Zhang and Zhao.

Zhang only played in mixed doubles in the last Super Series tournament of 2010, Hong Kong Open. Seeded fifth, he and Zhao reached the final but lost in a long three-set match against Joachim Fischer Nielsen and Christinna Pedersen of Denmark 20–22, 21–14, and 20–22.

2011
Zhang and Zhao were qualified to play in the 2010 Super Series Finals Taiwan. They became the winner by beating Thailand's Sudket Prapakamol and Saralee Thungthongkam 21–17, 21–12 in the final. Zhang and Chai also played in the Super Series Finals, yet both were conquered by Jung Jae-sung and Lee Yong-dae in the last four 15–21 and 11–21 in just 30 minutes.

Once again, Zhang and Zhao met Tao Jiaming and Tian Qing, now in Korea Open final. Zhang and Zhao vanquished their teammates 21–17, 13–21, and 21–19 to become the first winners of a Super Series Premier.

2012
In July–August at the London Olympics, he won the gold medal at the mixed doubles event with Zhao Yunlei, beating compatriots Xu Chen and Ma Jin in the gold medal match, 21–11, 21–17.

2016
At the 2016 Olympics, Zhang and Zhao, the defending champions in the mixed doubles event, lost in the semi-final, but successfully clinched a bronze medal after winning a rematch of the last edition's final, beating Xu Chen and Ma Jin in straight games again. On the other hand, Zhang won the gold medal with Fu Haifeng in the men's doubles event, beating Malaysians Goh V Shem and Tan Wee Kiong in a tightly-fought match, 16–21, 21–11, 23–21. They saved two gold medal points during the third game, and eventually converted one on their first opportunity.

2017
Zhang won the World Championships in the men's doubles event with Liu Cheng, defeating Indonesians Mohammad Ahsan and Rian Agung Saputro in the final, 21–10, 21–17 to win the gold medal.

2022: Resignation from the Chinese national badminton team 
Zhang announced his resignation from the Chinese national team in late August on his Weibo account, stating that he would continue to play badminton as an independent player with the permission of the Chinese Badminton Association.

Achievements

Olympic Games 
Men's doubles

Mixed doubles

BWF World Championships 
Men's doubles

Mixed doubles

Asian Games 
Mixed doubles

Asian Championships 
Men's doubles

Mixed doubles

East Asian Games 
Men's doubles

BWF World Junior Championships 
Mixed doubles

Asian Junior Championships 
Boys' doubles

Mixed doubles

BWF World Tour (2 titles, 1 runner-up) 
The BWF World Tour, which was announced on 19 March 2017 and implemented in 2018, is a series of elite badminton tournaments sanctioned by the Badminton World Federation (BWF). The BWF World Tour is divided into levels of World Tour Finals, Super 1000, Super 750, Super 500, Super 300, and the BWF Tour Super 100.

Men's doubles

Mixed doubles

BWF Superseries (31 titles, 15 runners-up) 
The BWF Superseries, which was launched on 14 December 2006 and implemented in 2007, was a series of elite badminton tournaments, sanctioned by the Badminton World Federation (BWF). BWF Superseries levels were Superseries and Superseries Premier. A season of Superseries consisted of twelve tournaments around the world that had been introduced since 2011. Successful players were invited to the Superseries Finals, which were held at the end of each year.

Men's doubles

Mixed doubles

  Superseries Finals Tournament
  Superseries Premier Tournament
  Superseries Tournament

BWF Grand Prix (7 titles, 4 runners-up) 
The BWF Grand Prix had two levels, the Grand Prix and Grand Prix Gold. It was a series of badminton tournaments sanctioned by the Badminton World Federation (BWF) and played between 2007 and 2017.

Men's doubles

Mixed doubles

  BWF Grand Prix Gold tournament
  BWF Grand Prix tournament

BWF International Challenge/Series (1 title) 
Men's doubles

 BWF International Challenge tournament
 BWF International Series tournament
 BWF Future Series tournament

Personal life
He started a relationship with his mixed doubles partner Zhao Yunlei in 2010. However, before 2016 Summer Olympics, Zhao Yunlei announced that she and Zhang Nan were no longer together. He later married another Chinese badminton player Tian Qing in November 2018.

References

External links
 
 
 
 
 2010 Asian Games Badminton Biography
 Thomas and Uber Cup Selected Squad

1990 births
Living people
Badminton players from Beijing
Chinese male badminton players
Badminton players at the 2012 Summer Olympics
Badminton players at the 2016 Summer Olympics
Olympic badminton players of China
2016 Olympic gold medalists for China
2016 Olympic bronze medalists for China
Olympic medalists in badminton
Medalists at the 2012 Summer Olympics
Medalists at the 2016 Summer Olympics
Badminton players at the 2010 Asian Games
Badminton players at the 2014 Asian Games
Badminton players at the 2018 Asian Games
Asian Games gold medalists for China
Asian Games silver medalists for China
Asian Games medalists in badminton
Medalists at the 2010 Asian Games
Medalists at the 2014 Asian Games
Medalists at the 2018 Asian Games
World No. 1 badminton players